Mathias Damm Kvistgaarden (born 15 April 2002) is a Danish professional footballer who plays as a forward for Danish Superliga club Brøndby IF. He has represented Denmark at youth level.

Club career

Brøndby

Youth
Born in Birkerød, Kvistgaarden began his career at hometown club IF Skjold Birkerød. At age 11, he was noticed by scouts of FC Nordsjælland at a youth trial, while at the same time going on trial at Lyngby Boldklub; eventually choosing to move to the Lyngby youth academy in 2013. Two years later, he joined the youth academy of Brøndby IF at U13-level, partly due to the Kvistgaarden family's close relationship to former head coach of Brøndby, Thomas Frank. At the same time, he enrolled as a pupil at Brøndbyvester Skole located less than one kilometre from the club, with his main course being physical education. He described the environment in the youth squads as being very competitive compared to his former experiences in IF Skjold and Lyngby, and the Brøndby U13-team ended up in first place of the table of their respective youth league that year. Kvistgaarden was promoted to the U19-team in the summer of 2019, and scored nine goals in 14 appearances in their campaign in the under-19 league.

First team
Kvistgaarden was included in the first-team squad for the first time on 5 July 2020, ahead of an away match in the Danish Superliga against AaB, due to regular first team strikers Simon Hedlund and Samuel Mráz having been tested positive for COVID-19. During the match, which Brøndby lost 2–0, Kvistgaarden made his debut as a 73rd-minute substitute for Mikael Uhre.

His first senior goal came on 6 March 2022, which proved to be the winning goal in a 1–0 away victory against Silkeborg in the domestic league. He made his first start for Brøndby on 14 April in a league loss against AaB. He signed a contract extension on 29 April, keeping him at the club until 2025. In May 2022, Kvistgaarden scored four goals in three league appearances, including his first brace on the final matchday of the season against Silkeborg. Before the match, he had been named Superliga Young Player of the Month for May.

International career
Kvistgaarden has won six caps for Denmark at under-18 level in which he has scored three goals. He made his debut for the Denmark under-19 team on 8 October 2020 in a friendly against Poland, where he scored a goal in a 3–1 win. 

On 4 June 2022, Kvistgaarden gained his first cap for the Denmark under-21s in the UEFA European Under-21 Championship qualifier against Kazakhstan. He started and played 63 minutes before being substituted for Rasmus Højlund in a 3–0 win at Vejle Stadium. He scored his first goal for the under-21 team ten days later against Turkey, poking in the ball at the far post after an assist by Gustav Isaksen.

Career statistics

Honours
Brøndby
 Danish Superliga: 2020–21

Individual
 Superliga Young Player of the Month: May 2022

References

External links
 

2002 births
Living people
IF Skjold Birkerød players
Lyngby Boldklub players
Brøndby IF players
Danish men's footballers
Denmark youth international footballers
Denmark under-21 international footballers
Association football forwards
Danish Superliga players
Sportspeople from the Capital Region of Denmark